Gustavo de Jesús Gaviria Rivero (25 December 1946 – 11 August 1990) was a Colombian drug trafficker. As Pablo Escobar's cousin and right-hand man, Gaviria controlled the Medellín cartel's finances and trade routes. He and Escobar had collaborated in their criminal careers since the early 1970s.

Though he was the owner of a fortune comparable to Escobar's and even had a military apparatus at his service, Gaviria was not as well known, as he kept a low profile.

The events leading to his death are unclear. It is speculated he was killed by Search Bloc and the incident was covered up to prevent retaliation.

Gustavo's death deeply affected Escobar, given their deep personal and professional relationship. Nonetheless, Escobar did not attend his cousin's funeral but instead listened to the funeral mass via a radio his assistant had attached to the officiating priest.

After Gustavo's death, Escobar decided to turn himself in but to stay at La Catedral, a jail of his own making, guarded by his own guards. Since Gustavo died four days after President César Gaviria took office, at the time, the media and the country in general thought the president had begun his term with an offensive against the narcoterrorists. Gustavo's death triggered a counter-offensive by Escobar that initially destabilized the new president's administration.

In popular culture
 Gustavo was played by actor Juan Pablo Raba in the first season of the Netflix television series, Narcos. The series attributes his death to the former members of the Search Bloc as well as relatives of Escobar's victims, but depicts it happening some time into the Gaviria administration.
 Actor Christian Tappan plays "Gonzalo Gaviria", a character inspired on Gustavo Gaviria, in the 2012 television series Pablo Escobar, The Drug Lord.
 In TV Series Tres Caínes is portrayed by the Colombian actor Julio Pachón
 In TV Series En la boca del lobo is portrayed by Simón Rivera as the character of Pariente Gavirno.

References 

1949 births
1990 deaths
Colombian drug traffickers
Medellín Cartel traffickers
Murdered criminals
People from Pereira, Colombia